Hubert Butler (11 July 1906 – unknown) was an English professional footballer who played as a forward.

Playing career
Butler was born in Atherton, then in Lancashire but subsequently part of Greater Manchester. He began his career in non-league football at Chorley F.C. and in June 1928 signed for Crystal Palace, then playing in the Football League Third Division South. He made his debut in an away defeat to Northampton Town in October and then became a regular in the side which finished second in the table in 1928–9 making 26 League appearances and scoring 10 times. Over the following three seasons, Butler made 22 appearances (four goals), 39 appearances (14 goals) and 21 appearances (3 goals) respectively. In June 1932, Butler moved on to Chester City. He had made 124 appearances in all competitions for Palace, scoring 39 times.

References

External links
Butler at holmesdale.com

1906 births
People from Atherton, Greater Manchester
English footballers
English Football League players
Association football forwards
Crystal Palace F.C. players
Chester City F.C. players
Year of death missing